The Coup is an American political hip hop group based in Oakland, California. Their discography consists of six studio albums, two extended plays, and eight singles.

Albums

Studio albums

Extended plays
 The EP (1991)
 La Grande Boutique (2014)

Guest appearances
 Ill Crew Universal ICU: The Revival (1998)
 Various: No More Prisons (1999)

References

Discographies of American artists